Nichiō (日奥, 1565–1630) was a Nichiren Buddhist who founded the Fuju-fuse subsect. His sect was founded when he refused to attend funeral services for Hideyoshi. The regent Tokugawa Ieyasu subsequently exiled him to Tsushima.

External links 
 http://nichirenscoffeehouse.net/Ryuei/HokkeShu_04.html

1565 births
1630 deaths
Japanese Buddhist clergy
Nichiren Buddhism
Nichiren Buddhist monks
Edo period Buddhist clergy